The 2021 Men's Rugby League World Cup featured 16 international teams, with each consisting of up to a 24-man squad.

Group A

England
Head coach:  Shaun Wane

England announced their 24-man squad on 30 September 2022. Debut call-ups were handed to Andy Ackers, Herbie Farnworth, Kai Pearce-Paul, Victor Radley, Marc Sneyd and Dom Young.

France
Head coach:  Laurent Frayssinous

France announced their 24-man squad on 24 September 2022. Experienced players Théo Fages, Julian Bousquet, and Romain Navarrete were all unavailable due to injuries, as was Lucas Albert.

Greece
Head coach:  Steve Georgallis

Greece announced their 24-man squad on 15 September 2022. The squad includes players from the professional competitions and from the Greek domestic competition. Billy Tsikrikas was initially named in the squad but withdrew. He was replaced by Siteni Taukamo. Flocas, Gal, Ilias and Taukamo are the only uncapped players in the squad. Grigoris Koutsimpogiorgos was ruled out for the remainder of the tournament due to concussion. Adam Vrahnos was added to the squad as his replacement.

Samoa
Head coach:  Matt Parish

Samoa announced their 24-man squad on 27 September 2022. Luciano Leilua was initially included in the squad but was withdrawn after he was charged with two criminal offences. Ligi Sao was announced as his replacement on 8 October. Braden Hamlin-Uele, Tyrone May and Hamiso Tabuai-Fidow were ruled out for the remainder of the tournament due to injury. Ken Sio and Tim Lafai were added to the squad as their replacements.

Group B

Australia
Head coach:  Mal Meninga

Australia announced their 24-man squad on 3 October 2022. Debut call-ups were handed to Matt Burton, Patrick Carrigan, Nathan Cleary, Lindsay Collins, Reuben Cotter, Angus Crichton, Tino Fa'asuamaleaui, Campbell Graham, Harry Grant, Liam Martin, Jeremiah Nanai, Murray Taulagi and Isaah Yeo. Nicho Hynes, Dylan Edwards and Damien Cook were named as standby players.

The players' jersey numbers were announced on 6 October. The decision to number players in order of their Kangaroos debut (except captain James Tedesco, who was allocated #1), rather than the conventional positional numbering, was met with widespread backlash and derision.

Fiji
Head coach:  Wise Kativerata

Fiji announced their 24-man squad on 4 October 2022. A 33-man squad was initially named on 6 September 2022.

Head coach Joe Rabele was replaced by Wise Kativerata after being hospitalised due to illness. Pio Seci (#3), Mikaele Ravalawa (#5), and Kaylen Miller (#15) all suffered tournament-ending injuries during Fiji's warm-up match against England on 7 October. They were replaced by Korbin Sims, Mitieli Vulikijapani, and Tevita Toloi.

Italy
Head coach:  Leo Epifania

Italy announced their 24-man squad on 30 September 2022. Cooper Johns was initially named in the squad but withdrew and was replaced by Radean Robinson.

Scotland
Head coach:  Nathan Graham

Scotland announced their 24-man squad on 28 September 2022. They announced their squad numbers on 14 October.

Group C

Ireland
Head coach:  Ged Corcoran

Ireland announced their 24-man squad on 29 September 2022. They announced their squad numbers on 14 October.

Jamaica
Head coach:  Romeo Monteith

Jamaica announced their 24-man squad on 28 September 2022. Six players from the domestic competition are named in the squad, including former Excelsior Community College winger Abevia McDonald (now playing for London Skolars).

Lebanon
Head coach:  Michael Cheika

Lebanon announced their 24-man squad on 29 September 2022. Atef Hamdan was initially named in the squad but withdrew. He was replaced by Robin Hachache.

New Zealand
Head coach:  Michael Maguire

New Zealand announced their 24-man squad on 3 October 2022. A 34-man squad was initially named, which included Braden Hamlin-Uele, Corey Harawira-Naera, Shaun Johnson, Ken Maumalo, Griffin Neame, Jordan Riki, Matt Timoko, Kodi Nikorima and Bailey Simonsson.

Group D

Cook Islands
Head coach:  Tony Iro

The Cook Islands announced their 24-man squad on 4 October 2022. Adam Tangata and Malachi Morgan were named as standby players. Anthony Gelling withdrew from the squad following their match against Papua New Guinea on 25 October.

Papua New Guinea
Head coach:  Stanley Tepend

Papua New Guinea announced their 24-man squad on 3 October 2022. On 21 October, Coates and Gebbie were ruled out for the rest of the tournament due to injury. No replacements were added.

Tonga
Head coach:  Kristian Woolf

Tonga announced their 24-man squad on 3 October 2022. A 38-man squad was initially named on 16 September.

Wales
Head coach:  John Kear

Wales announced their 24-man squad on 3 October 2022. Ben Evans was ruled out for the remainder of the tournament due to a throat injury. He was replaced by Luke Thomas.

References

2021 Rugby League World Cup
Rugby League World Cup squads